Devanga Arts College, is a general degree college located in Aruppukottai, Virudhunagar district, Tamil Nadu. The college is affiliated with Madurai Kamaraj University. This college offers different courses in arts, commerce and science.

Accreditation
The college is  recognized by the University Grants Commission (UGC).

Controversy
Devanga Arts College's assistant professor got caught in an alleged scandal where she tried to lure four female students for prostitution. College authorities suspended the assistant professor after the girls filed a complaint. College authorities said Ms. P. Nirmala Devi was suspended on 21 March, two days after the four final years B.Sc. students filed a written complaint. However, no police complaint has been filed by the college in this matter.

See also
Education in India
Literacy in India
List of educational institutions in Virudhunagar district
List of institutions of higher education in Tamil Nadu

References

External links
https://dac.org.in/

Colleges affiliated to Madurai Kamaraj University
Universities and colleges in Madurai district